Owen Patrick Bosson (born 24 July 1980), known by his short name Opie Bosson, is a jockey in Thoroughbred racing in New Zealand.

Riding career

Bosson started as an apprentice for Stephen Autridge, his godfather.  He began his race-day riding career as a 15 year old on the 25 October 1995 with Comette at Dargaville and soon after had his first win on Fairlie Airlie at Gisborne.

In the 1997 season he was the McBeath Apprentice of the Year at the BMW New Zealand Thoroughbred Racing Awards and was eighth on the New Zealand Premiership, behind Lance O'Sullivan, with 75 wins from 703 starts.  The next apprentice was Mark Sweeney on 53 wins.

On 2 September 1998 Bosson rode the first Australian winner for Chris Waller, Party Belle, in a 2100m maiden race at Wyong.

His first Group 1 victory was Jezabeel in the 1998 Auckland Cup, aged 17.

In March 2019 Bosson surpassed the record of Lance O'Sullivan as the winner of the most New Zealand Group 1 races, with 63 when Melody Belle won the New Zealand Stakes at Ellerslie.

As at the end of the 2021 season, Bosson has won:

 over 1,800 New Zealand races. 
 78 Group 1 races (10 in Australia).

Personal life

Opie Bosson is the son of Owen and Glenda Bosson.  Owen was a prominent amateur jockey.

At the end of 2017, Bosson married TAB Trackside Television presenter Emily Murphy.

Notable victories

The following are some of the major races Opie has won in New Zealand and Australia.

See also 
 Thoroughbred racing in New Zealand

References

External links
 Opie Bosson

1980 births
Living people
New Zealand jockeys